Superintendent of Indian Affairs may refer to:

Superintendent in the Indian Department of British North America
Superintendent of Indian Affairs at the Bureau of Indian Affairs in the U.S.
Minister of Crown–Indigenous Relations in Canada
Oregon Superintendent of Indian Affairs